The Bosphorus or Bosporus is a major waterway in Istanbul, Turkey, that forms part of the Turkish Straits.

Bosphorus or Bosporus may also refer to:

Media
 Le Bosphore Égyptien, French newspaper published in Egypt between 1882 and 1894

Places
 Boğaziçi (Istanbul), the neighborhoods surrounding the Bosphorus in Istanbul, Turkey
 Eastern Bosphorus, a strait in Russia
 The Bosporan Kingdom, an ancient Hellenic state
 Bosporus (see), the ancient Crimean city and Latin Catholic titular archbishopric
 The Crimean Kerch Strait, which was known as the Cimmerian Bosporus historically

Institutions
 Bosphorus University, an institute of higher education in Istanbul, Turkey
 Bosphorus Cymbals, a Turkish manufacturer of music cymbals.